Weston James Sandle  (19 March 1935 – 19 February 2020) was a New Zealand physicist who specialised in the study of lasers. He was a professor at the University of Otago.

Biography
Born on 19 March 1935, Sandle studied at Canterbury University College, graduating Master of Science with first-class honours in 1958. He went on to study at the University of California, Berkeley, where he earned a Master of Arts degree, and then a PhD in physics in 1968. The title of his doctoral thesis was 19F nuclear magnetic resonance in the canted antiferromagnet KMnF3.

Appointed to the faculty of the University of Otago in 1963, Sandle rose to become a full professor in 1986. He served as head of the Department of Physics at Otago for a time, and retired in 2001, when he was accorded the title of professor emeritus. Much of Sandle's research was concerned with laser theory and the application of lasers, including laser stability, Raman lasers, and laser cavity resonators. He was also interested in optical switches, optical pumping, optical bistability and optical chaos.

In 1998, Sandle was elected a Fellow of the Royal Society of New Zealand, and he was also a Fellow of the New Zealand Institute of Physics. In the 2004 New Year Honours, he was appointed an Officer of the New Zealand Order of Merit, for services to science.

Sandle was predeceased by his wife, Pat, to whom he was married for 56 years, in 2019. He died in Dunedin on 19 February 2020.

Selected works

References

1935 births
2020 deaths
University of Canterbury alumni
University of California, Berkeley alumni
New Zealand physicists
Academic staff of the University of Otago
Fellows of the Royal Society of New Zealand
Officers of the New Zealand Order of Merit